This article lists common URI schemes.  A Uniform Resource Identifier helps identify a source without ambiguity. Many URI schemes are registered with the IANA; however, there exist many unofficial URI schemes as well. Mobile deep links are one example of a class of unofficial URI schemes that allow for linking directly to a specific location in a mobile app.

Official IANA-registered schemes
The official URI schemes registered with the IANA are as follows (note that "IETF Draft" in no way is a finalized specification and must not be treated so; refer to Section 2.2 of RFC 2026 for more details):

Unofficial but common URI schemes

References

External links 
Official IANA Registry of URI Schemes
More information, including many more schemes

 
Request for Comments